The 1962 Paris–Roubaix was the 60th edition of the Paris–Roubaix cycle race and was held on 9 April 1962. The race started in Compiègne and finished in Roubaix. The race was won by Rik Van Looy of the Flandria team.

General classification

References

Paris–Roubaix
Paris-Roubaix
Paris-Roubaix
Paris-Roubaix
Paris-Roubaix